Finger(s) of God or God's Finger may refer to:

 Finger of God, a biblical phrase used to explain the creation of the Ten Commandments

Rock formations
 El Dedo de Dios, in  Spain
 Mukurob, in Namibia
  God's Finger Rock, at Serra dos Órgãos in Brazil

Celestial patterns
 Fingers of God, type of pattern involving clusters of galaxies
 Finger of God (Carina), nebula
 Finger of God (Cygnus), a.k.a. Witch's Broom in Veil Nebula

Other
 Used to describe a maximum-rated (F5/EF5) tornado on the Enhanced Fujita scale. Popularized by the 1996 film Twister
 Yod (astrology), sometimes called the Finger of God, a rare astrological occurrence said to indicate struggles in one's life